A subbasin or sub-basin is a structural geologic feature where a larger basin is divided into a series of smaller basins with intervening intrabasinal highs. 

The term subbasin has common use in geologic literature, but has yet to be included in the API Glossary of Geology.

References

Depressions (geology)
Geology terminology